Medinvesttrade was an association with limited liability, headquarters of which is located in Donetsk. On November 17, 2011 the Economic court of Zaporizhia Region adapted a decision to liquidate the bankrupted company Medinvesttrade.

The company became known after on September 25, 2007 it signed an exchange agreement with a state company Nadra Ukrayiny headed by Eduard Stavytsky, after which the state residence Mezhyhirya ended up in private hands. Previously, Nadra Ukrayiny received Mezhyhirya residence on July 11, 2007 after the transfer was approved by the Fund of State Property.

The exchange between Medinvesttrade and Nadra Ukrayiny involved number of real estates in Vyshhorod Raion and Kyiv city. Nadra Ukrayiny agreed to hand over buildings, structures, and other equipment of Pushcha-Vodytsia recreational complex in Novi Petrivtsi (addresses: 19 vulytsia Ivana Franka and 123a vulytsia Mezhyhirska) at an estimated price ₴91,771,620. In exchange Nadra Ukrayiny received complex of buildings in Kyiv (address: 3, 5, 7 Parkova doroha) with estimated price ₴93,115,419.

Next month in October 2007 Medinvesttrade file a lawsuit in the Economic court of Kyiv city about recognizing the exchange agreement as invalid, but has lost it and, thus, legalizing the process.

On November 19, 2007 Medinvesttrade sold the exchanged property to Tantalit.

See also
 Ukraine Air Enterprise

References

External links
 They returned to Yanukovych the cottage. DELO. July 28, 2008.

Companies of Ukraine
Economy of Donetsk
Ukrainian brands
Construction and civil engineering companies of Ukraine